Silver Lake is an intermittent high-desert lake in Lake County, Oregon, United States. It is unknown who first gave the lake its descriptive name. Central Oregon residents attribute it to John C. Frémont, although no proof has been found, and he would not have seen the lake on his first visit to Oregon in 1843. The Klamath called the lake Kalpshi, which may have been derived from the word kalapsh, meaning a decayed log. The name was used because of the petrified wood near the lake.

See also
 List of lakes in Oregon

References

Lakes of Oregon
Lakes of Lake County, Oregon
Endorheic lakes of Oregon